Linha do Sul is a Portuguese railway line which connects Campolide A, in Lisbon, and Tunes, in the Algarve. The first section, from Pinhal Novo to Setúbal, was opened in 1861. The route to Funcheira opened on 25 May 1920. In 2003 it was linked to Lisbon, crossing the Tagus River on the 25 de Abril Bridge.

The section between Pinhal Novo and Funcheira was classified as Linha do Sado until 1992, while the section from Barreiro to Vila Real de Santo António via Vendas Novas and Beja was classified as Linha do Sul.

See also 
 List of railway lines in Portugal
 List of Portuguese locomotives and railcars
 History of rail transport in Portugal

References

Sources

Further reading

Sul
Iberian gauge railways
Railway lines opened in 1861